The unification of Moldavia and Wallachia, also known as the unification of the Romanian Principalities or as the Little Union, happened on 1859 following the election of Alexandru Ioan Cuza as prince of both the Principality of Moldavia and the Principality of Wallachia. A potential unification between the two principalities, which shared a common Romanian ethnicity, language and culture, had been attempted to be avoided by the great powers for a long time, although it was allowed at the moment it happened. The unification of these two states began a political struggle in the new country to find out which of the two regions would obtain "supremacy" and met some opposition in Moldavia by the so-called "separatists".

Nowadays, in Romania, the unification of Moldavia and Wallachia is regarded as a prelude to the Great Union, a name used in Romanian historiography to refer to the unifications of Romania with the regions of Bessarabia, Bukovina and Transylvania in 1918 during or following the end of World War I. It is also commemorated every 24 January through the Day of the Unification of the Romanian Principalities in both Romania and Moldova.

See also
 German unification
 Italian unification
 Romanian nationalism
 Greater Romania
 Unification of Moldova and Romania

References

1859 in Romania
January 1859 events in Europe
Politics of Romania
History of Romania
History of Moldavia (1822–1859)
History of Wallachia (1821–1859)
Great Union (Romania)
Romanian nationalism
Romania
Territorial evolution of Romania
History of Eastern Europe
19th century in Europe
19th century in politics
History of the Ottoman Empire
Politics of the Ottoman Empire